Gabriella Csilla Pincze (born 19 April 1989) is a Hungarian footballer who plays as a midfielder for German club SV Donsbrüggen, where she serves as the captain. She has been a member of the Hungary women's national team.

Club career
Pincze has played for 1. FC Femina, Taksony-Bíró-Kert SE and Astra Hungary FC in Hungary and for Alemannia Pfalzdorf and SV Donsbrüggen,

International career
Pincze capped for Hungary at senior level during the 2015 FIFA Women's World Cup qualification – UEFA Group 7.

References

1989 births
Living people
Hungarian women's footballers
Women's association football midfielders
Astra Hungary FC players
Hungary women's international footballers
Hungarian expatriate footballers
Hungarian expatriate sportspeople in Germany
Expatriate women's footballers in Germany